Gillmeria is a genus of moths in the family Pterophoridae. The genus was described by the English schoolteacher and entomologist, James William Tutt in 1905.

Species

Gillmeria albertae 
Gillmeria armeniaca 
Gillmeria irakella 
Gillmeria macrornis 
Gillmeria melanoschista 
Gillmeria miantodactylus 
Gillmeria omissalis 
Gillmeria pallidactyla 
Gillmeria rhusiodactyla 
Gillmeria scutata 
Gillmeria stenoptiloides 
Gillmeria tetradactyla 
Gillmeria vesta

References

Platyptiliini
Moth genera
Taxa named by J. W. Tutt
Articles containing video clips